Aleksandar "Sašo" Grajf (born 25 June 1965 in Maribor, SR Slovenia) is a Slovenian biathlete and cross-country skier who competed at five Olympics from 1984 to 2002. He competed for Yugoslavia in cross-country skiing at the 1984 and 1988 Olympics and for Slovenia in biathlon at the 1992, 1998, and 2002 Olympics.

In 2002 he became the second Slovenian to compete at five Olympics, after Rajmond Debevec (who went on to compete at three more Olympics). They have since been joined by biathlete Janez Ožbolt in 2006 and rower Iztok Čop in 2008.

External links
 Sports-Reference Profile

1965 births
Living people
Slovenian male biathletes
Slovenian male cross-country skiers
Yugoslav male cross-country skiers
Sportspeople from Maribor
Olympic biathletes of Slovenia
Olympic cross-country skiers of Yugoslavia
Biathletes at the 1992 Winter Olympics
Biathletes at the 1998 Winter Olympics
Biathletes at the 2002 Winter Olympics
Cross-country skiers at the 1984 Winter Olympics
Cross-country skiers at the 1988 Winter Olympics